Larry Hausmann is an American former soccer player who spent nine seasons in the North American Soccer League.  He also earned eight caps with the U.S. national team between 1968 and 1972.

Professional
In 1959, Huasmann graduated from Bishop DuBourg High School.  He is a member of the Bishop DuBourg Athletic Hall of Fame.  He played several seasons with St. Louis Kutis SC.  In 1967, he joined the Chicago Mustangs of the United Soccer Association.  In 1968, the Mustangs moved to the North American Soccer League but folded at the end of the season.  Hausmann moved to the St. Louis Stars in 1969.  He played no games that season, but became a regular in 1970.  In 1971, as a member of the Stars, he took part in the league's first ever indoor tournament, scoring no goals and earning two penalty minutes. He remained with the team through the 1975 season.

National team
Hausmann earned eight caps with the U.S. national team.  His first came on September 15, 1968 in a 3–3 tie with Israel.  His last game with the national team came in a 2–2 tie with Canada on August 29, 1972.

He was inducted into the St. Louis Soccer Hall of Fame on September 24, 1993.

References

External links
 NASL Stats

1941 births
Living people
Soccer players from St. Louis
American soccer players
Association football midfielders
Chicago Mustangs (1967–68) players
North American Soccer League (1968–1984) players
North American Soccer League (1968–1984) indoor players
St. Louis Stars (soccer) players
St. Louis Kutis players
United States men's international soccer players
United Soccer Association players